Bleik is a fishing village in Andøy Municipality in Nordland county, Norway.

The triangle-shaped island off the coast is called Bleiksøya. This island is the biggest resort of puffins in all of Norway. The lake Bleiksvatnet lies just south of the village.

Bleik has one of the longest beaches in Norway, and it is said that the beach is the reason for the village's name. The beach is white, and bleik is a word for white/pale in the Norwegian language. In the village, there is a horse barn, a school, and a grocery store. Tourist information, puffin safari, a camping site and a pub are also available.
Bleik is also known for naming the Bleik Canyon, which starts about 15 km offshore from the beach of Bleik in the Norwegian Sea. Bleik Canyon is a very deep canyon with depths up to 3.000 m and is the residence of whales and Giant squid.  It is a popular hotspot for whale safaris because of the presence of Sperm whales.

Notable residents
Lasse Nilsen, footballer for Tromsø

References

Villages in Nordland
Populated places in Nordland
Andøy
Populated places of Arctic Norway
Beaches of Norway